Ranch Hand Truck Accessories is an American manufacturer of after market heavy duty truck accessories.

History
Established in 1986, Ranch Hand was founded in Boerne, Texas.  Their original product was a grille guard which they called a "donkey knocker."  In January 2000 It was acquired by the Kaspar Companies, a family owned group of businesses.  The Kaspar Companies merged their brand, Kaspar Ranch Gear, with the Ranch Hand brand name and in 2001 moved all manufacturing to their central location in Shiner, Texas.

They currently have over 190 employees and two manufacturing facilities; their original . facility located in Shiner, Texas, a new facility in Beeville, Texas, a  warehouse and distribution center, and a full scale paint line and packaging line.  Although manufacturing in general is a simpler business, their manufacturing facilities use state of the art technology.

Over time, the brand grew and now today, Ranch Hand's products are sold through company owned stores, distributors, new truck dealerships, and Truck/SUV accessory dealers.  Direct sales in the US are focused primarily on factory outlet stores located in Texas, Colorado and Oklahoma.  Their dealer network covers most of the US and parts of Canada.

Products
Ranch Hand manufactures grille guards, push bars, front end replacements, back bumper replacements for full size trucks and SUV's as well as various smaller products such as steps, headache racks, haulers and toolboxes.  Some significant differences in the product were developed.  Instead of painting products, a new super polyester baked finish was developed.  Also, expanded metal, commonly used as the mesh for BBQ grills was replaced with a higher quality custom punched insert which is custom made to match the make and the model of the vehicle.  Their products are also fully welded and mount directly to the vehicle frame.  One of the more unique features they have is the use of custom punched grille inserts to match the make and model of the vehicle the grille is being mounted on.

They also produce various fleet products targeting emergency vehicles including patrol cars and fire & rescue vehicles. In June 2010, they released a niche market product called the Wind Bed for wind farm maintenance crews.

They currently have products for the full size vehicles produced by General Motors, Toyota, Chevrolet, Ford Motor Company, Dodge, and Jeep

Brand image and marketing
Ranch Hand's reputation was built on rugged durability and has evolved into a heavy-duty product that is designed to enhance the look of the latest model trucks and SUV's. Their logo has evolved over the years as well as their overall brand image.  The image they portray today is that Ranch Hand is tough and dependable. Similar to  Harley-Davidson, they use an advocate marketing strategy where they have created a strong culture of loyal followers of rural ranchers and people in the working trades who use their Ranch Hand product on a daily basis and test it to the limit.  This brand image in turn invites other people to join in on the Ranch Hand.

They are a member of SEMA automotive aftermarket show where they showcase their product line and update dealers on innovations, new models, and updates.

Ranch Hand grille guards and front end replacements do offer a degree of protection in accidents ranging from fender benders to head on collisions, but the company will not claim protection as one of their selling points with their marketing in order to avoid liability issues.

References

Auto parts suppliers of the United States